Filippo Ranocchia (born 14 May 2001) is an Italian professional footballer who plays as a midfielder for  club Monza, on loan from Juventus.

Club career

Early career 
Ranocchia began his youth career at Scuola Calcio Monte Malbe, playing between the Pulcini (under-11) and Esordienti (under-13). He joined Perugia's youth sector in 2013, scouted by Roberto Goretti. During the 2017–18 season, Ranocchia played 19 games for the Primavera (under-19) team; he signed his first professional contract on 16 July 2018.

Juventus

Loan to Perugia 
On 30 January 2019, Ranocchia moved from to Juventus, re-joining Perugia on a two-year loan. He made his Serie B debut for Perugia on 30 March 2019, in a game against Livorno as an 88th-minute substitute for Marcello Falzerano.

Juventus U23 
On 2 September 2019, the loan was terminated early and Ranocchia joined Juventus' youth squad. In 2019–20 Ranocchia played one game for Serie C side Juventus U23 – the reserve team of Juventus – on 25 January 2020, in a 3–2 defeat to Pro Patria. 

He became a permanent member of Juventus U23 in the 2020–21 season, scoring first senior career goal in a 2–1 away win against Giana Erminio on 3 October 2020. Ranocchia played 31 games that season, scoring four goals.

Loan to Vicenza 
On 31 August 2021, Ranocchia was loaned to Vicenza. He made his debut on 12 September, in a 2–1 defeat against Cosenza. On 30 April 2022, Ranocchia scored the decisive goal in the 13th minute of added time in a 2–1 win against Serie B leaders Lecce. He ended the 2021–22 season with 32 league games (30 in the regular season). Ranocchia renewed with Juventus on 20 July until 2026.

Loan to Monza 
On 21 July 2022, newly-promoted Serie A side Monza signed Ranocchia on a one-year loan, with option to buy and counter option in favour of Juventus. He made his Serie A debut for Monza on 14 August, as a starter in a 2–1 defeat to Torino. On 22 October, Ranocchia scored his first Serie A goal, via a direct free kick in a 4–1 defeat away to AC Milan.

International career 
In 2015, Ranocchia was called up for a training camp with the Italy national under-15 team. He made his debut with Italy U21 on 8 October 2021, in a 2023 UEFA European Under-21 Championship qualification game against Bosnia and Herzegovina. In May 2022, Ranocchia was called up by head coach Roberto Mancini for a training session with the senior national team.

Style of play 
Ranocchia is a midfielder who mainly plays as a mezzala, but can also play as a deep-lying playmaker. His main characteristics are his ball control, dribbling and long-distance shooting; he is also ambipedal, as he can use both feet with equal ability.

Career statistics

Club

Honours
Juventus
 Coppa Italia: 2020–21
 Supercoppa Italiana: 2020

References

External links

 Filippo Ranocchia A.C. Monza profile 
 
 

2001 births
Living people
Italian footballers
Sportspeople from Perugia
Footballers from Umbria
Association football midfielders
Juventus F.C. players
A.C. Perugia Calcio players
Juventus Next Gen players
L.R. Vicenza players
A.C. Monza players
Serie B players
Serie C players
Serie A players